Royal Lytham & St Annes Golf Club in Lytham St Annes, Lancashire, England, is one of the courses in the Open Championship rotation. The Women's British Open has also been played on the course five times: once prior to being designated a major championship by the LPGA Tour, and four times since.

History
Royal Lytham & St Annes Golf Club was founded in 1886 and the present course constructed in 1897. The clubhouse celebrated its centenary in 1998. It is one of the premier links courses in the world, host to ten Open Championships, two Ryder Cups and numerous other major tournaments including the Women's and Seniors Open Championships.

It is renowned as a course on which is it hard to scramble a good score, after all, there are 167 bunkers peppering the fairways and surrounding the greens. It may not be the longest of courses but it is one where careful thought and accurate shots are required.

The Open Championship
The Open Championship has been held eleven times at Royal Lytham & St. Annes:

Note: For multiple winners of The Open Championship, superscript ordinal identifies which in their respective careers.
(a) denotes amateur

Women's British Open
The Women's British Open has been held five times at Royal Lytham & St. Annes:

Notes
 For multiple winners of the Women's British Open, superscript ordinal identifies which in their respective careers.
 Years in bold signify editions that were recognised as major championships by the LPGA (2001-present).Since its inception in 1979, the Women's British Open has always been a major on the Ladies European Tour.

Scorecard

The 6th hole was a par 5 in previous Opens (1969-2001)

Lengths of the course for The Open Championship (since 1950):

See also
List of golf clubs granted Royal status

References

External links

Golf clubs and courses in Lancashire
The Open Championship venues
Ryder Cup venues
Curtis Cup venues
Walker Cup venues
Organisations based in England with royal patronage
Golf clubs and courses designed by Harry Colt
Sport in the Borough of Fylde
Lytham St Annes
Sports venues completed in 1886
1886 establishments in England
Royal golf clubs